Spartacist may refer to:
An ancient supporter of Spartacus, who led a slave rebellion against the Roman Republic
The Spartacus League, a left-wing Marxist revolutionary movement in Germany during and just after World War I
The modern Spartacist League, also known as the International Communist League, a Trotskyist international organisation